The Happy Cats is an album by trumpeter Joe Newman's Sextet recorded in early 1957 for the Coral label.

Reception

Allmusic gave the album 3 stars.

Track listing
All compositions by Joe Newman except as indicated
 "The Happy Cats" - 3:08
 "Cocktails for Two" (Arthur Johnston, Sam Coslow) - 2:53 	
 "Later for the Happenings" (Johnny Acea) - 3:39
 "Buttercup" (Bud Powell) - 4:04 	
 "Robbin's Nest" (Illinois Jacquet, Sir Charles Thompson) - 4:25
 "They Can't Take That Away from Me" (George Gershwin, Ira Gershwin) - 2:18
 "Feather's Nest" (Ernie Wilkins) - 3:46
 "Mean to Me" (Fred E. Ahlert, Roy Turk) - 3:00 	
 "Between the Devil and the Deep Blue Sea" (Harold Arlen, Ted Koehler) - 3:34
 "Joe's Tune" - 3:19
 "I Never Knew" (Ted Fio Rito, Gus Kahn) - 3:31

Personnel 
Joe Newman - trumpet
Frank Rehak - trombone
Frank Wess - tenor saxophone, flute
Johnny Acea - piano
Eddie Jones - bass
Connie Kay - drums
Al Cohn (tracks 6, 8 & 9), Ernie Wilkins (tracks 2, 5, 7, 10 & 11), Quincy Jones (tracks 4) - arranger

References 

1957 albums
Coral Records albums
Joe Newman (trumpeter) albums
Albums arranged by Ernie Wilkins
Albums arranged by Quincy Jones